"Bad Dreams" is the 11th episode of the second season of the HBO original series The Wire. The episode was written by George Pelecanos from a story by David Simon & George Pelecanos and was directed by Ernest Dickerson. It originally aired on August 17, 2003. The episode was submitted to the American Film Institute for consideration in their TV programs of the year award and the show subsequently won the award.

Plot
The Sobotka detail serve warrants. Daniels, Bunk, Greggs and Freamon find Glekas' warehouse completely stripped of evidence. Weapons are found in Eton's home while Serge and White Mike are arrested. Herc and Carver search Nick's residence, finding heroin and cash. Valchek and FBI supervisor Amanda Reese hold off on apprehending Frank at home, wanting to make his arrest high-profile. Daniels decides to leave Vondas on the street, hoping to identify the man he works for. When he learns that Glekas was killed by Ziggy, Daniels is outraged that Landsman left him out of the loop and that their investigation has been compromised. Meanwhile, Frank and Horseface calmly accept their arrests when the FBI raids the stevedores union. Reese delays taking the captives outside until the press arrives. The Greek's associates refuse to talk under questioning, but White Mike gives up information on Eton and Serge. Frank's lawyers shepherd him through a detention hearing.

The detail focuses attention on Vondas, who is tailed from his home to a meeting at the Inner Harbor. Greggs and Beadie follow Vondas into a parking garage, with Beadie getting her first foot pursuit by tailing Vondas to his hotel room. McNulty photographs Vondas leaving the hotel with his lawyer, mistakenly believing the attorney to be Vondas' superior, and happens to get a chance shot of The Greek. Vondas switches cars and loses Greggs, who is oblivious as The Greek walks past her. Daniels and Pearlman mistakenly assume that Vondas' lawyer is in charge of the smuggling ring. Beadie volunteers to approach Frank and convince him to cooperate in exchange for probation and witness protection. Nick returns home and is treated coldly by his parents as they clean up after the police. Frank visits a jailed Ziggy, who expresses resentment that his father spent more time with union business than him, and remorse for killing Glekas. Louis, Frank's brother and Nick's father, confronts Frank about his failure to keep Nick out of a life of crime.

Frank's arrest makes him a pariah within the union, but he is allowed to work a ship. Bruce tells Frank that the arrest has dried up his political support. Beadie urges Frank to come forward as an informant to save himself, telling him that there are different kinds of wrong and that he is better than those he has gotten involved with. Frank comes to the detail and agrees to cooperate, so Nick can get leniency and Ziggy can be moved to a safer jail, on condition that he does not give up any union men. Pearlman agrees on straight probation for Frank and Nick. Frank agrees to return with a lawyer the next day. Vondas convinces Nick to set up a meeting with Frank with the promise of helping Ziggy, causing Frank to reconsider his deal with the police. Frank decides to meet The Greek and Vondas alone underneath the Francis Scott Key Bridge, putting his son above his dreams for the docks. However, by this point The Greek has been tipped off by Agent Koutris that Frank has turned informant, making it unlikely that Frank will survive the meeting.

Stringer tells Omar that Brother Mouzone was responsible for torturing and killing Brandon, offering to give him up if Omar will cease his pursuit of the Barksdale Organization. With the aid of his crew, Omar knocks out Mouzone's partner Lamar and shoots Mouzone himself as he answers the door of his hotel room. When Omar explains why he is there, Mouzone tells him that he has been misinformed. Omar believes his story and phones for an ambulance on his way out of the hotel.

Production

Title reference
The title refers to the way that Frank's hopes to rejuvenate the docks by becoming involved with crime have had dire consequences for him and his family. It may also refer to the morning raids that wake everyone involved in the conspiracy.

Epigraph

Frank Sobotka while talking with his lawyers after his arrest. To get clean is to wash the blood off his hands that he never expected or wanted caused by a desire to simply keep his people at the port able to work properly and progressively. He starts this process by returning to the docks to work a simple hard day's labor, and also by talking to the police about the smuggling organization headed by the Greek. Frank comes to a tragic end by the time the episode is over with because he couldn’t get clean.

Music
The two Greek songs at the end of the episode were sung by Stelios Kazantzidis. In the restaurant, the song playing in the background was "To Psomi tis Ksenitias" (Bread of a Foreign Land). The song played during the montage at the end is a less well-known song, "Ena Sidero Anameno" (Ένα σίδερο αναμένο; also known by its refrain, Ephyge, "She left") a love song. Both songs were chosen by the episode's writer George Pelecanos who is Greek American.

Credits

Starring cast
Although credited, John Doman and Wood Harris do not appear in this episode.

Guest stars
Seth Gilliam as Detective Ellis Carver
Domenick Lombardozzi as Detective Thomas "Herc" Hauk
Jim True-Frost as Detective Roland "Prez" Pryzbylewski (credited, but does not appear)
James Ransone as Ziggy Sobotka
Pablo Schreiber as Nick Sobotka
Michael Potts as Brother Mouzone
Michael K. Williams as Omar Little
Chris Ashworth as Sergei Malatov
Al Brown as Major Stanislaus Valchek
Bill Raymond as The Greek
Delaney Williams as Sergeant Jay Landsman
Luray Cooper as Nat Coxson
Robert Hogan as Louis Sobotka
Bus Howard as Ott
Doug Lory as Big Roy
Richard Pelzman as Little Big Roy
Benay Berger as FBI Supervisor Amanda Reese
Toni Lewis as Assistant United States Attorney Nadiva Bryant
Kevin McKelvy as FBI Agent
Doug Olear as FBI Agent Terrance "Fitz" Fitzhugh
William L. Thomas as FBI Agent
Kelli R. Brown as Kimmy
Edwina Findley as Tosha Mitchell
Tom Mardirosian as Agent Koutris
Gordana Rashovich as Ilona Petrovich
Brook Yeaton as "White" Mike McArdle
Keith Flippen as Bruce DiBiago
Aphrodite Georgelakos as Unknown
Clifton Gross as stevedore
Steve Lukiewski as stevedore
Jackie Sawiris as Unknown
Paul G. Sepczynski as stevedore

Uncredited appearances
Derren M. Fuentes as QRT Leader Torret
Tommy Hahn as FBI Special Agent Salmond
Merritt Wever as Prissy
Lev Gorens as Eton Ben-Eleazer
Charley Scalies as Thomas "Horseface" Pakusa
Jeffrey Pratt Gordon as Johnny "Fifty" Spamanto
Elisabeth Noone as Joan Sobotka
DeAndre McCullough as Lamar
David Simon as reporter at Sobotka's arrest

Clifton Gross, Steve Lukiewski, and Paul G. Sepczynski are all real-life stevedores who appear as stevedores in this episode. Lukiewski is a hiring hall dispatcher and emulates this position when Sobotka uses another member's card to work. Gross and Sepczynski are the stevedores helping Sobotka to unload the ship.

Reception

Awards and nominations
The episode was submitted to the American Film Institute for consideration in their TV programs of the year award. The show subsequently won the award and the institute commented that "The Wire portrays mundane police work with tragic grandeur and, in doing so, captures the seemingly intractable problem of drugs in American society in a daring and unique way. Complex and subtle, the series offers a look at police procedure more realistic than any show on television."

References

External links
"Bad Dreams"  at HBO.com

The Wire (season 2) episodes
2003 American television episodes
Television episodes directed by Ernest Dickerson